Zapadnaya (Bilylivka) is an impact crater in Ukraine near the village of Bilylivka in the southeasternmost edge of Zhytomyr Oblast and near the border of Vinnytsia Oblast. It is situated in the northwestern part of the Ukrainian crystalline shield.

The crater is not exposed at the surface.

References

Further reading 
 Gurov E.P., Gurova E.P., Sokur T.M., Geology and Petrography of the Zapadnaya impact crater in the Ukrainian shield, 2000
 Gurov, E. P., Gurova, E.P. and Rakitskaya,R.B., Impact diamonds of the Zapadnaya crater: Phase composition and some properties (abstract). Meteoritics & Planetary Science, v. 31, p. A56. 1996
 Gurov, E. P., Gurova, E.P. and Rakitskaya,R.B., Impact diamonds in the craters of the Ukrainian shield (abstract). Meteoritics, v. 30, pp. 515–516. 1995
 Gurov, E. P., The characteristics of the geological structure of the eroded astrobleme in the western part of the Ukrainian Shield (in Russian). Dipovidi Adademii Nauk Ukrainskoi Rodyanskoi Sotsialistychnoi Respubliky, Seriya "B", pp. 8-11. 1985
 Sokur, T. M., Shock Metamorphism of Quartz of the Zapadnaya Crater, LPSC XXIX, Lunar and Planetary Institute, Houston, TX, (CD-ROM). 1998

Impact craters of Ukraine
Jurassic impact craters
Middle Jurassic Europe
Geography of Vinnytsia Oblast
Geography of Zhytomyr Oblast